Fox Sports, also referred to as Fox Sports Media Group and stylized in all caps as FOX Sports, is the sports programming division of the Fox Corporation that is responsible for sports broadcasts carried by the Fox broadcast network, Fox Sports 1 (FS1), Fox Sports 2 (FS2), and the Fox Sports Radio network.

The division was formed in 1994 with Fox's acquisition of broadcast rights to National Football League (NFL) games. In subsequent years, Fox has televised the National Hockey League (NHL) (1994–1999), Major League Baseball (1996–present), NASCAR (2001–present), the Bowl Championship Series (BCS) (2007–2010), Major League Soccer (MLS) (2003–2011, 2015–2022), the U.S. Open golf tournament (2015–2019), the National Hot Rod Association (NHRA) (2016–present), WWE programming (2019–present), the XFL (2020), and the United States Football League (USFL) (2022-present).

On December 14, 2017, The Walt Disney Company announced plans to acquire then-parent company 21st Century Fox for $52.4 billion, which included key assets such as the regional Fox Sports Networks (which were later sold by Disney to the Sinclair Broadcast Group), FX Networks, and Fox Sports International. Under the terms of the proposed acquisition, Fox Sports 1, Fox Sports 2, and other assets were spun off into the division's current parent company, which is independently owned by 21st Century Fox's current shareholders.

History

Establishment 
When the Fox Broadcasting Company launched in October 1986, the network's management, having seen how sports programming (in particular, soccer events) played a critical role in the growth of the British satellite service BSkyB, determined that sports would be the type of programming that would ascend Fox to a major network status the quickest; as a result, Fox tried to attract a professional football package to the network. In 1987, after ABC initially hedged on renewing its contract with the National Football League (NFL) for the television rights to Monday Night Football, Fox made an offer for the package at the same price that ABC had been paying at the time – about $13 million per game. However, partly due to the fact that Fox had yet to establish itself as a major network, the NFL decided to resume negotiations with ABC, with the two parties eventually agreeing to a new contract, keeping what was the crown jewel of the league's television broadcasts on that network (where it remained until 2006, when MNF moved to sister network ESPN as part of a contract that also saw NBC gain the Sunday Night Football package).

Six years later, as the league's television contracts for both the National Football Conference and American Football Conference divisions, and for the Sunday and Monday primetime football packages were up for renewal, Fox placed a bid for $1.58 billion to obtain the broadcast rights to the National Football Conference. On December 17, 1993, the NFL selected Fox's bid and signed a four-year contract with the network to award it the rights to televise regular season and playoff (as well as select preseason) games from the NFC, beginning with the 1994 season; the initial contract also included the exclusive U.S. television rights to broadcast Super Bowl XXXI in 1997. The deal stripped CBS of football telecasts for the first time since 1955.

Fox also lured commentators Pat Summerall, John Madden, Dick Stockton, Matt Millen, James Brown and Terry Bradshaw as well as many behind-the-scenes production personnel from CBS Sports to staff the network's NFL coverage. The network's studio coverage originated from the Fox Television Center in Hollywood, CA, later moving to the Fox Network Center (located on the 20th Century Fox backlot in Century City) by 1999.

In order to bolster viewership for the NFL telecasts, Fox parent News Corporation decided to strike affiliation deals with broadcasting companies that owned stations affiliated with ABC, NBC and CBS in order to raise the profile of Fox's affiliate body, which at the time mainly consisted of UHF stations that (with some exceptions) had little to no prior history as a major network affiliate, had weaker signals and largely did not carry as much value with advertisers as the Big Three's affiliates. During the late spring and summer of 1994, Fox reached separate agreements with New World Communications (a media company controlled by investor Ronald Perelman, which Fox's station group Fox Television Stations would purchase in July 1996) and SF Broadcasting (a joint venture between Fox and Savoy Pictures that purchased four stations from Burnham Broadcasting through separate deals in July and August 1994) to switch a total of sixteen stations to Fox between September 1994 and September 1996 as affiliation contracts with those stations' existing network partners expired. The NFL television rights and affiliation deals firmly established Fox as the nation's fourth major network. The network's relationship with the NFL would expand in 1997, when it began airing games and acquired partial ownership of NFL Europe (although the partial ownership ended in 2000), an agreement which ended in 2006 when all games were moved to NFL Network; the by-then renamed NFL Europa closed down the next year.

With a sports division now established, Fox decided to seek broadcast rights agreements with other major sports leagues. On September 9, 1994, Fox was awarded the broadcast television rights to the National Hockey League in a $155 million bid (amounting to $31 million annually); as a result, it became the first broadcast network to be awarded a national television contract to carry NHL games, which longtime NHL Commissioner John Ziegler had long thought to be unattainable (NHL games had not aired regularly on a national broadcast network – outside of select championship and All-Star games, and time buy basis airings of ESPN telecasts on ABC from 1992 to 1994 – since NBC's telecast of the 1975 Stanley Cup Finals, as networks were not willing to commit to broadcasting a large number of games due to low viewership). Again, Fox outbid CBS, which wanted to secure the rights as a result of losing the NFL to Fox, for the NHL package. Fox lost the NHL rights to ABC Sports and ESPN in 1999.

MLB, NASCAR, and BCS acquisitions 
On November 7, 1995, Fox was awarded partial broadcast rights to Major League Baseball games, in a shared deal with NBC (which had carried the league's telecasts since 1947). Through the deal, which Fox paid a fraction of the amount ($115 million) that CBS paid to obtain the rights effective with the 1990 season, Fox would broadcast approximately 16 regular season Saturday afternoon games per season (unlike the previous Baseball Network deal between NBC and ABC) and offered different game broadcasts shown on a regionalized basis (usually up to three per week). As part of a six-year renewal of this deal – valued at $2.5 billion – in September 2000, Fox Sports became the exclusive over-the-air broadcaster of Major League Baseball, giving it the exclusive rights to the World Series beginning with the 2000 edition, as well as rights to the All-Star Game, select Division Series games and exclusive coverage of the League Championship Series. Under a clause in the contract (which has not been exercised as there has not been a labor dispute during the term of rights while Fox Sports has held the contract), if some of the scheduled games were cancelled by a strike or lockout, Fox would still pay Major League Baseball for a full slate of annual games, while the league in turn had to compensate Fox with additional telecasts.

In 1998, Fox obtained the broadcast rights to the Cotton Bowl Classic college football game. In 2007, Fox began airing most of the games of the Bowl Championship Series, including the BCS National Championship Game, in a deal worth close to $20 million per game. Due to a separate arrangement between ABC and the Pasadena Tournament of Roses Association, events in the series that were held at the Rose Bowl stadium – such as the Rose Bowl Game and the 2010 BCS Championship – were excluded from the contract.

On November 11, 1999, Fox and sister cable channel FX were awarded rights to the NASCAR Winston Cup Series and Busch Series as part of NASCAR's first centralized television rights deal, beginning in the 2001 season. The contract covered the first half of the season, with the second half of the season being aired by NBC and TNT. Rights to the Daytona 500 and Pepsi 400 alternated annually, with Fox airing the 500 in odd-numbered years, and the 400 in even-numbered years. Fox's first telecast was the 2001 Daytona 500—an event that would be marred by a final-lap crash that resulted in the death of Dale Earnhardt. Later that year, Fox acquired the motorsports cable network Speedvision, and rebranded it in February 2002 as Speed Channel. Fox intended to use the network as an outlet for ancillary NASCAR content. In September 2002, Speed Channel bought out ESPN's contract to televise the NASCAR Craftsman Truck Series.

Fox lost the broadcasting rights to the Bowl Championship Series to ESPN beginning in 2010. In response, Fox introduced a Saturday "game of the week" on FX in 2011, featuring games from the Pac-12, the Big 12 and Conference USA (the rights to which were later assumed by Fox and Fox Sports 1); Fox also signed deals to carry two new championship games created through conference realignments that occurred in 2010 and 2011: the Big Ten Conference Championship through 2016 (as part of Fox Sports' involvement with the Big Ten Network), and the Pac-12 Championship through 2017 on an alternating basis with ESPN. With the replacement of the BCS with the College Football Playoff, Fox lost the broadcasting rights to the 2015 Cotton Bowl Classic onwards again to ESPN.

Present day 
In May 2010, Fox aired the final of the UEFA Champions League, marking the network's first ever soccer broadcast.

In August 2011, Fox Sports announced it had reached a seven-year broadcast agreement with the Ultimate Fighting Championship (UFC), ending the mixed martial arts promotion's relationship with Spike. The deal included the rights to broadcast four live events in prime time or late night annually, as well as other UFC programming that would air on various Fox properties, including the Fox network (which aired its first UFC match in November 2011, the first time that the UFC aired an event on broadcast television), FX and Fuel TV. The contract expired in 2019, with the UFC moving its broadcast rights to ESPN.

On October 22, 2011, FIFA announced that Fox Sports had acquired rights to air its tournaments beginning in 2015, including the 2015 and 2019 FIFA Women's World Cup, and the 2018 and 2022 FIFA World Cup. In February 2015, Fox's contract was extended to 2026 (which was ultimately awarded to a joint North American bid led by the United States), in what was reported to be compensation for the rescheduling of the 2022 tournament to late-November/mid-December (which will compete with the regular seasons of the NFL).

On August 6, 2013, Fox Sports announced a 12-year deal to broadcast the championships of the United States Golf Association (USGA), including the U.S. Open, beginning in 2015. In 2016, Fox began to air NHRA drag racing events—primarily on Fox Sports 1 and 2, and with selected flagship events airing on Fox proper.

On July 24, 2017, the Big Ten Conference announced that it had reached six-year deals with Fox Sports and ESPN to hold rights to its football games beginning in the 2017 season, with Fox's package expanding on its involvement in BTN. As part of the contract, Fox's contract to run BTN was extended through 2032.

On January 31, 2018, the NFL announced that Fox had acquired the sub-license for its Thursday Night Football package under a five-year deal, beginning in the 2018 NFL season. The deal is reportedly worth an average of more than $660 million per year. On May 6, 2019, Fox Sports announced a multi-year broadcast deal with the XFL, which itself would cease operations less than a year later.

In May 2019, Fox Sports partnered with The Stars Group to launch co-branded sports betting operations, including Fox Bet (which offers real-money sports betting where legal), as well as the free football prediction game Fox Sports Super 6. As part of the partnership, Fox Corporation acquired a 4.99% minority stake in the company for $236 million, with an option to increase its stake to up to 50% within the next 10 years. The partnership made Fox the first major U.S. sports broadcaster to establish a sports betting operation, taking advantage of the repeal of the Professional and Amateur Sports Protection Act of 1992. With the company's sale to Flutter Entertainment, Fox would have an option in 2021 to acquire an 18.5% stake in its U.S. subsidiary FanDuel Group.

In June 2020, Fox exited its contract with the USGA and sold the remainder to previous rightsholder NBC.

In June 2021, it was announced that Fox would be a minority investor in a new iteration of the United States Football League (USFL), which would operate as a successor to The Spring League.

In November 2021, it was announced that Fox Sports had acquired English-language rights to UEFA national team matches under a six-year deal from 2022 to 2028, replacing ESPN. This includes the UEFA Nations League beginning in June 2022, tournaments such as UEFA Euro 2024 and 2028, UEFA qualifiers for Euro and the FIFA World Cup, and UEFA-organized friendlies. In January 2022, Fox announced that it would sub-license portions of this package to FuboTV, focusing on the Nations League and selected matches from the European Championships.

Channels
In addition to the broadcast division, Fox Sports Media Group owns numerous regional and national cable sports channels and radio network in the United States, which include:
 Fox Sports 1 – a national general sports network, which presents a wide variety of sports programming.
 Fox Sports 2 – a national general sports network, which serves as a counterpart to FS1.
 Big Ten Network – a joint venture with the Big Ten Conference, airing various sporting events involving and programs pertaining to its member schools.
 Fox Soccer Plus – a subscription-based sports network (originating as a spin-off of the now-defunct Fox Soccer), which broadcasts domestic and international soccer matches, including the UEFA Champions League among other competitions.
 Fox Sports Racing – a motorsports-oriented sports network operating in North American markets outside of the U.S. as a replacement for Speed, which primarily carries motorsports events from FS1 and FS2.
 Fox Deportes – a Spanish-language network, which airs coverage of UEFA Champions League, as well as the FIFA Beach Soccer World Cup and the F.A. Cup. It also presents Spanish-language coverage of the Major League Baseball Game of the Week, the All-Star Game, and the World Series, as well as division and league playoffs.
 Fox Sports Radio – a national sports talk radio network managed by Premiere Networks in partnership with Fox Sports.

2013 cable reorganization
Fox Sports Media Group formally announced the replacement of Speed with Fox Sports 1 on March 5, 2013, with the network eventually launching on the tentative date of August 17, 2013. The network would air content from Major League Baseball, the UFC, NASCAR, soccer (including the FIFA World Cup) and multiple college sports events (including owning rights to Big East basketball and its annual postseason basketball tournament at Madison Square Garden). The network launched Fox Sports Live as a competitor to ESPN's SportsCenter, with the former described as a "24/7 news franchise providing around-the-clock coverage through regularly scheduled programs, hourly updates and an information-rich ticker that provides a network agnostic sports event television schedule." Notable personalities on FS1 include Regis Philbin, Mike Tyson, Michael Strahan, Erin Andrews, as well as many others. The international feed of Speed would eventually be replaced with Fox Sports Racing on February 20, 2015.

On August 17, 2013, the extreme sports-focused Fuel TV was rebranded as Fox Sports 2, a companion network serving primarily as an overflow channel for Fox Sports 1, along with providing supplementary sports coverage.

On September 2, 2013, Fox Soccer was replaced by FXX, an entertainment-based sister network to FX with a focus on comedy programming. With the concurrent shutdown and replacement of the network, Fox Soccer's sports programming was shifted over to Fox Sports 1 and Fox Sports 2. As a result, outside of very rare sports conflicts on both Fox Sports networks, FX no longer carries any sports programming. Fox Soccer's companion premium service, Fox Soccer Plus, continues to exist and supplements soccer coverage on Fox Sports 1 and Fox Sports 2.

Former affiliates
 Fox College Sports – a slate of three cable channels (Atlantic, Central and Pacific) produced by regional Fox Sports Networks, which airs additional college sports content from across the country.

Regional sports networks
Prior to its acquisition by the Sinclair Broadcast Group, Fox Sports Networks operated as a slate of regional sports networks with broadcasting agreements that follow league market distribution rules. For example, cable and satellite subscribers in Kansas City, Missouri receive Kansas City Royals games on Fox Sports Midwest, while viewers in Milwaukee, Wisconsin see Milwaukee Brewers games on Fox Sports Wisconsin. The regionalized coverage frequently restricts broadcasts of live sporting events outside of a team's home market.

In addition to game coverage, the regional networks also air regionally-based news, analysis, magazine, and documentary programming, as well as some common national programming.

In some markets, the regional Fox Sports network operates one or multiple overflow feeds that carry additional programs that cannot be carried on the main feed due to event conflicts.

On March 31, 2021, the Fox Sports Networks rebranded as Bally Sports.

Fox Sports Arizona
Fox Sports Detroit 
Fox Sports Detroit Plus
Fox Sports Florida 
Fox Sports Sun
Fox Sports Indiana
Fox Sports Kansas City
Fox Sports Midwest
Fox Sports New Orleans
Fox Sports North
Fox Sports Ohio 
SportsTime Ohio
Fox Sports Oklahoma
Fox Sports San Diego
Fox Sports South
Fox Sports Tennessee
Fox Sports Carolinas 
Fox Sports Southeast 
Fox Sports Southwest
Fox Sports West and Prime Ticket
Fox Sports Wisconsin
Fox Sports Northwest 
Fox Sports Pittsburgh 
Fox Sports Rocky Mountain
Fox Sports Utah
Fox Sports New York 
YES Network

International
 Fox Sports International – operated as an international sports programming and production entity that distributed sports programming to various countries in Europe, Asia and Latin America.

Technical evolution

High-definition coverage
For Super Bowl XXXVI in 2002, Fox Sports produced its first telecast in a 16:9, 480p enhanced-definition format marketed as "Fox Widescreen"; while promoted as having better quality than standard definition, and being the first U.S. sporting event produced completely in a widescreen format, it was not true high definition, but still matched the aspect ratio of HDTV sets.

Fox Sports began producing selected events in 720p high definition, starting on July 3, 2004 with the Pepsi 400, select NFL games, the 2004 Major League Baseball All-Star Game, and that year's postseason.

During the following years, Fox would produce more sports telecasts in HD, but still fell back on using 480p widescreen for events not televised in HD.

As of late July 2010, all sports programming broadcast by Fox-owned networks began transitioning to a format optimized for 16:9 widescreen displays, with graphics framed within a widescreen safe area rather than the 4:3 safe area, intended to be shown in a letterboxed format on standard definition feeds.

Virtual reality 
From 2016 until selling its virtual reality division FoxNext to Disney in 2019, Fox Sports produced a limited number of game telecasts in 360-degree virtual reality, mostly college football. A TV Everywhere login was required to access the broadcast.

4K coverage 
In 2017, Fox Sports began to produce selected telecasts in 4K ultra-high-definition television, beginning with selected NASCAR and college basketball events, and for the 2017 season, a college football game per-week. They are primarily available via DirecTV and other supported providers.

Fox began televising its Thursday Night Football games in 1080p upconverted to 4K with HLG HDR on September 26, 2019.

Technological enhancements
 FoxBox (sports)
 FoxTrax
 Major League Baseball on Fox – Innovations

Graphics, scoring bugs, and theme music
The graphics and scoring bugs used by Fox Sports have won awards and changed how sports broadcasts are presented on United States television.  The opening notes of the theme used on the Fox network's NFL broadcasts are incorporated in iterations of other themes used on Fox Sports broadcasts. Originally, when the scoring bugs are upgraded, the previous versions were retained for one of the division's other properties for about a year; however, this practice ended in 2009. The first score bug was used for Fox's NFL coverage, and was then expanded to the network's baseball and hockey broadcasts.

One segment of the Scott Schreer-composed theme, coincidentally or otherwise, echoes the notes for the "giddyup, giddyup, giddyup, let's go" line from the Leroy Anderson-composed song, Sleigh Ride. Although, the rhythm of that segment of both tunes is similar to that of the first four bars of both the first and second figures of the Johann Strauss Sr.-composed Radetzky March, which itself is similar to that of the finale of Gioachino Rossini's overture to his opera William Tell. During sports broadcasts aired during the Christmas holiday season, Fox Sports broadcasts will sometimes acknowledge this fact by seguéing from the one tune into the other during the commercial break outcue.

Beginning in October 2010, the NFL on FOX theme became uniform for all Fox Sports properties beginning with the National League Championship Series that year and NASCAR races with the 2011 Budweiser Shootout.  However, NASCAR and MLB broadcasts reinstated their own theme music in 2016 and 2020, respectively, and the CBB on FOX telecasts were switched over to "Roundball Rock", which was formerly used by the NBA on NBC, in 2019. In 2022 USFL on FOX uses the NFL theme.

2001–2003
By 2001, the score bug was restructured as a banner positioned at the top of the screen, and was simpler than the version used today. It was first utilized that year on Fox's NASCAR coverage with the introduction of a new updated graphics package that was based on the 1998 design; the banner and updated graphics were then utilized on the network's Major League Baseball and NFL telecasts. It featured a translucent black rectangle, a baseball diamond graphic for baseball broadcasts on the far left, the team abbreviations in white with their scores in yellow boxes (the boxes were white for NFL broadcasts until Super Bowl XXXVI, when the coloring was changed to yellow), then the quarter or inning, time or number of outs, pitch count/speed (used for baseball broadcasts), and the logo of the Fox Sports event property whose game is being telecast (such as NFL on Fox or MLB on Fox) on the far right.

2003–2006
Beginning with the 2003 NFL season, the banner was upgraded as part of a new graphics package. At first, the team abbreviations were replaced with team logos, and the scores were rendered in white within black parallelograms. Unlike the previous version, the FoxBox would alternate between a black rectangle and several black parallelograms; however, it reverted to being a black rectangle beginning with the 2004 NFL season, and the team logos would later be replaced with abbreviations in the respective teams' primary colors (the colorized team abbreviations would first be utilized on postseason baseball broadcasts that year). Whenever a team scores a point or a run, the team's score and logo would flash a few times.

During baseball broadcasts, the entire banner would flash with the words "HOME RUN" and the team's name in the team's color zooming in to the center from both left and right. In late 2005, a new white banner resembling a chrome finish was introduced, and the team abbreviations became rendered in white letters in the team's main color; the new banner would then be expanded to NFL and NASCAR broadcasts. The baseball broadcasts continued to use the 2001 scoring banners and graphics in 2004 until the network's coverage of that year's postseason.

During NASCAR telecasts from 2007–2011, this graphic package was briefly used to weather delay updates and also used for merchandise for the Digger cam.
This Graphics Package is also used during Prelude to the Dream at Eldora from 2005–2007.

2006–2010
Beginning with the 2006 NFL season, the scoring banner was upgraded again. This time, real-time scores from around the league were included as a permanent fixture on the extreme right side of the bar, while the banner's coloring changed to the colors of the team currently in possession of the ball (this coloring scheme was seen only on football broadcasts). The banner no longer flashed after the scoring of runs, touchdowns or field goals. During baseball broadcasts, the diamond graphic appeared in middle-justification and was slimmed down to just the three main bases, unlike other implements which included home plate. This banner, after first being used for NFL broadcasts in 2006, was eventually expanded to Bowl Championship Series, NASCAR and MLB; baseball telecasts, however, continued to use the late-2005 scoring banners and graphics in 2007. In 2008, Fox NASCAR introduced a new camera embedded between turns one and two on the various tracks; it was soon known as "Digger Cam", unveiled alongside a gopher mascot named Digger. For the 2009 season, the 2006 graphics package was dropped entirely for Fox's baseball telecasts and replaced with the then-current Fox Sports Net graphics, which had debuted on baseball telecasts across FSN's affiliates that season. These were later repositioned for widescreen in July 2010, when Fox Sports began presenting all of its high definition programming content in the 16:9 aspect ratio, with letterboxing on standard definition feeds relayed to pay television providers.

2010–2014
At the beginning of the 2010 NFL pre-season, Fox debuted a new graphics package for its football coverage – an upgraded version of the 2006 design with a "much more colorful 3D look." The new graphics also marked a migration to Vizrt hardware for CG, providing producers with a more streamlined workflow for graphics. The new design would be rolled out for Fox's racing coverage and the Speed network in 2011, at the start of the 2011 MLB season (where both Fox and the FSN networks would begin using it as well, excluding SportSouth games simulcast by WPCH-TV and Root Sports – which used the previous FSN appearance), and on Fox Soccer.

Starting with the 2010 National League Championship Series, Fox began using its football theme music for its Major League Baseball broadcasts, to the confusion and dismay of some viewers. Division president Eric Shanks gave a rationale for the change, stating that the NFL theme music was more energetic than the previous theme; Shanks then announced that the NFL theme would be used for all Fox Sports telecasts going forward.

2014–2017
A new graphics package for Fox Sports broadcasts was introduced for Fox's NASCAR coverage leading up to the 2014 Daytona 500. Fox Sports Midwest producer Max Leinwand described the look as being "cleaner" than the previous design. The design has also been used to introduce new design conventions for some of Fox's graphics; for NASCAR, the running order ticker was replaced by a leaderboard-style display that was initially displayed as a vertical sidebar.  MLB uses a score bug at the bottom-right (initially at the bottom-left) of the screen instead of the top-left, while NFL utilized a top-left score bug with a vertical layout.

2017–present (flat, gradually being faced out)
A new graphics package was launched on August 27, 2017 for Fox's first NFL preseason broadcast, featuring a dark flat design scheme, and shifting football to a horizontal scoreboard along the bottom of the screen (in line with all other NFL broadcasters). Upon its debut, the new football scoreboard was widely panned by viewers for its basic appearance and small text size. This package was also adopted by Big Ten Network (which had previously used its own separate graphics packages), and was deployed for MLB coverage on Fox and FS1 starting with the 2017 MLB postseason. Fox continues to use Vizrt software, and began to increasingly utilize laptops to run its on-air graphics as opposed to full systems (maintained as backups). The introduction of the package to NASCAR for the 2018 season saw Fox once again adopt a vertical leaderboard for the running order, initially within an opaque sidebar before switching to a translucent design for the Daytona 500. These graphics remain on most Big Ten Network programming (with the exception of college basketball and football), as well as boxing, bowling and soccer.

2020–2022 (football only)
The football package, which features a theme based on parallelograms, a centered, pod-like scoreboard, and stylized illustrations of key players, debuted during Super Bowl LIV, and was adopted full-time by subsequent football telecasts (including the subsequent XFL and 2020 NFL and college football seasons).

2021–present (large, gradually being faced in)
In 2021, as part of a move to give its individual properties distinct brand recognition, Fox began to phase out the flat graphics in favor of dedicated graphics packages for each sport. The graphics do share some similarities, including the use of significantly larger fonts and large cartoon caricatures. These graphics are currently utilized on Major League Baseball telecasts (beginning with the 2021 postseason), college basketball telecasts (beginning with the 2021–22 CBB season, NASCAR (beginning with the 2022 NASCAR season, and the National Football League (beginning with Super Bowl LVII).

Public service
In February 2008, Fox Sports announced a new charitable foundation called Fox Sports Supports, which provides grants and marketing support for health-related causes. Each organization is tied to a specific events package seen on Fox Sports.

The following are the charities supported during the history of the program:

2008–2009 cycle (began with 2008 Daytona 500)
 NASCAR on Fox: Autism Speaks
 Major League Baseball on Fox: Make-A-Wish Foundation
 NFL on Fox: Children's Health Fund
 Fox College Football: Alzheimer's Association

2009–2010 cycle (began with 2009 Daytona 500)
 NASCAR on Fox: Susan G. Komen for the Cure
 Major League Baseball on Fox: The Michael J. Fox Foundation
 NFL on Fox: City of Hope National Medical Center
 Fox College Football: Malaria No More

Gambling 
In May 2019, amid the state-by-state legalization of sports betting in the United States following the repeal of the Professional and Amateur Sports Protection Act of 1992, Fox Corporation entered into a joint venture with The Stars Group to develop gaming products under the brand Fox Bet. They include free-to-play games such as Fox Bet Super 6, and real-money mobile sportsbook operating in several states where they are legal. The services and games are co-promoted on Fox Sports properties, including the Fox Sports 1 studio program Fox Bet Live (formerly Lock it In). As part of the agreement, Fox Corporation acquired a 4.99% stake in The Stars Group, which was later acquired by Flutter Entertainment. Fox holds a 2.6% minority stake in Flutter, and was given an option to acquire up to 18.5% of its U.S. division FanDuel in 2021.

Programming issues
Although the amount of sports content on the network has gradually expanded since Fox Sports was founded in 1994 (particularly since 2013), Fox's sports schedule on weekend afternoons has remained very inconsistent to this day as the majority of its sports contracts are with professional leagues and collegiate conferences associated with more widely known sporting events, with very limited supplementary coverage of amateur, extreme or winter sports (unlike NBC or CBS) that can be aired during the daytime even when major events are not broadcast – leaving absences in daytime sports coverage on either a Saturday, a Sunday or both on certain weeks. Syndicated programming (either in the form of feature films, series or both) and/or infomercials scheduled by the network's owned-and-operated stations and affiliates, as well as occasional Fox Sports-produced specials and Fox-supplied preview specials for upcoming primetime shows fill Fox stations' weekend afternoon schedules on days with limited to no sports programming.

Some of the network's sports telecasts (most frequently, college football and Sunday afternoon NFL games, and the World Series) delay or outright pre-empt regularly scheduled local evening newscasts on Fox stations due to typical overruns past a set time block or pre-determined later start times; a few Fox affiliates that maintain news departments (such as WBRC in Birmingham, Alabama and WVUE-DT in New Orleans) have opted not to air or have cancelled early evening newscasts on Saturdays and Sundays due to frequent sports preemptions in that daypart, while others (such as WDAF-TV in Kansas City, Missouri) instead reschedule their weekend early evening news programs to an earlier timeslot if possible when Fox is scheduled to air an evening game or race.

Conversely, some Fox Sports programming (though never major sports, NASCAR, or college football) is delayed for later airing for several reasons. WSVN in Miami traditionally delays Fox Sports' Sunday lower-tier racing programming to late night in order to maintain their revenue on Sunday afternoons for paid programming, while several stations often disregarded the pregame shows for the 2018 FIFA World Cup to reduce schedule disruption. In November 2018, WITI in Milwaukee opted to move the final of that year's Las Vegas Invitational college basketball tournament on that year's Black Friday to their secondary Antenna TV subchannel in order to avert disruption to their news schedule before a primetime airing of that year's Apple Cup football game. Fox's NFL Kickoff, preceding Fox NFL Sunday, is often aired on a secondary subchannel in several markets due to both official team programming and E/I programming burdens needing to be satisfied by Fox affiliates.

As is done with CBS, Fox offers a flex schedule for its NFL, NCAA and Major League Baseball telecasts, featuring a selection of up to four games that vary on a regional basis, allowing either one or (often) two consecutive telecasts to air on a given day depending on the Fox station's designated market.

Programs throughout the years

Current broadcast rights
 NFL on Fox (1994–present)
 Pre-game shows: Fox NFL Sunday (1994–present) and Fox NFL Kickoff (Fox, 2015–present; FS1, 2013–2015)
 Post-game show: The OT (2006–present)
 Super Bowl: XXXI, XXXIII, XXXVI, XXXIX, XLII, XLV, XLVIII, LI, LIV, LVII, LIX, LXIII, and LXVII

 Major League Baseball on Fox (1996–present)
 All-Star Game: 1997, 1999, 2001–present

 Fox College Football (1998–present)
 Big Noon Kickoff (2019–present)
 Big Noon Saturday (2019–present)
 Big 12 (2012–present)
 Pac-12 (2012–present)
 Big Ten (2017–present)
 Mountain West (2020–present)
 Big Ten Football Championship Game (2011–2023 and every other year from 2025–2029 (shared with NBC and CBS)
 Mountain West Conference Football Championship Game (2020–present)
 Holiday Bowl (2017–2019) (2022–present)

 Fox College Hoops (2013–present)
 Big East men's and women's basketball (2013–present)
 Big 12 men's and women's basketball (2023-present)
 Pac-12 men's and women's basketball (2013–present)
 Big Ten men's basketball (2017–present)
 Mountain West men's basketball (2020–present)
 Big East men's basketball tournament (2014–present)

 Motorsport
 NASCAR on Fox (2001–present)
 Daytona 500: 2001, 2003, 2005, 2007–present (exclusive through 2024)
 Other motorsport events
 NHRA Camping World Drag Racing Series (2016–present)
 ARCA Menards Series (2001–present)
 American Flat Track (2022–present)

 Fox Soccer
 FIFA World Cup (2018, 2022, 2026)
 FIFA Women's World Cup (2015, 2019, 2023)
 Canadian Premier League (2020–present)
 Major League Soccer (2003–2011, 2015–present)
 Liga MX (2018–present) - Monterrey, Santos Laguna, and Tijuana home games only
 CONCACAF Gold Cup (1998, 2002, 2007, 2009, 2011, 2013, 2015, 2017, 2019, 2021, 2023)
 CONCACAF Champions League (2012–present)
 CONMEBOL Copa America (2021, 2024)
 UEFA Nations League (2022–2028)
 UEFA European Championship (2024, 2028)
 Other
 Premier Boxing Champions (2015–present)
 Horse racing (1997–1999, 2014–present)
 Australian Football League (2012–present)
 National Rugby League (2014–present)
 Super League (2012–present)
 National Lacrosse League (2016–present)     
 Professional Bowlers Association (2019–present)
 WWE SmackDown (2019–present)
 Travers Stakes (2019–present)
 Belmont Stakes (2023–2030)
 United States Football League/The Spring League (2021–present, ownership stake since 2022)
 Davis Cup (2019–present)

Former broadcast rights
 NHL on Fox (1994–1999)
 Fox College Football
 Cotton Bowl Classic (1999–2014)
 Bowl Championship Series (2007–2010)
 Pac-12 Football Championship Game (2011 and every other year from 2012–2022) (shared with ESPN/ABC)
 Big 12 Football Championship Game (2017)
 San Francisco Bowl (2016–2019) 
 NFL on Fox
 NFL Europe (1997–2005)
 Pro Bowl (2008 and 2011)
 NFL Draft: Rounds 1–3 (2018; simulcast with NFL Network)
 Fox UFC (2011–2018)
 USGA Championships (2015–2019)
Big3 (2017–2018)
 XFL (2020)

 Motorsports
 Rolex 24 at Daytona (2002–2018)
 24 Hours of Le Mans (2002–2017)
 Formula One (2007–2012)
 Formula E (2014–2020)
 MotoGP (2014–2015)
 Monster Energy AMA Supercross (2014–2018)
 WeatherTech SportsCar Championship (2014–2018)
 Monster Jam (2014–2018)

 Soccer
 UEFA Champions League (2009–2018)
 UEFA Europa League (2009–2018)
 US Open Cup (2000–2003, 2006–2011)
 USL First Division (2005–2009)
 USL Second Division (2002–2010)
 USL Premier Development League (2002–2011)
 USL Pro (2011)
 National Women's Soccer League (2013, 2015)
 W-League (2002–2011)
 Major Indoor Soccer League (2007–08)
 Copa Libertadores (2014–2018)
 International Champions Cup (2013–2015)
 Premier League (1998–2013)
 FA Cup (2014–2018)
 Scottish Premiership (2013–2017)
 A-League (2002–2004, 2013–2016)
 Copa América Centenario (2016)
 Bundesliga (2015–2020)
 U.S. men's national soccer team (2015–2022)
 U.S. women's national soccer team (2015–2022)
 FIFA Confederations Cup (2017)
 Copa Centroamericana (2017)

Notable personalities

Current

Play-by-play
 NFL on Fox – Kevin Burkhardt, Joe Davis, Adam Amin, Kenny Albert, Kevin Kugler, Chris Myers, Brandon Gaudin, Noah Eagle, Dan Hellie
 Major League Baseball on Fox – Joe Davis, Adam Amin, Jason Benetti, Aaron Goldsmith, Kevin Burkhardt, Kenny Albert, Len Kasper, Don Orsillo, Alex Faust, Brandon Gaudin, Kevin Kugler
 NASCAR on Fox – Mike Joy, Adam Alexander, Jamie Little
 Fox College Football – Gus Johnson, Jason Benetti, Tim Brando, Noah Eagle, Alex Faust, Eric Collins, Adam Alexander
 Fox College Hoops – Gus Johnson, Joe Davis, Tim Brando, Brian Anderson, Kevin Kugler, Adam Amin, Jason Benetti, Brandon Gaudin, Kevin Burkhardt, Noah Eagle, Scott Graham, Steve Physioc, Jeff Levering, Lisa Byington, Dave Sims, Kevin Fitzgerald, Matt Schumacker, Adam Alexander, Pat O'Keefe, John Fanta, Jenny Cavnar
 Fox Soccer – John Strong, JP Dellacamera, Glenn Davis, Mark Followill, Keith Costigan, Adrian Garcia-Marquez, Jorge Perez-Navarro, Jake Zivin, Jenn Hildreth, Derek Rae, Lisa Byington, Kate Scott, Nate Bukaty, Callum Williams, Ian Darke, Jacqui Oatley
 Fox NHRA – Brian Lohnes
PBA on Fox – Rob Stone, Dave Ryan
USFL – Curt Menefee, Kevin Kugler

Analysts
 NFL on Fox – Terry Bradshaw, Howie Long, Jimmy Johnson, Michael Strahan, Mike Pereira (game rules analyst), Tom Brady, Greg Olsen, Daryl Johnston, Mark Schlereth, Jonathan Vilma, Mark Sanchez, Robert Smith, Dean Blandino (studio rules analyst), Brady Quinn
 Major League Baseball on Fox – John Smoltz, Tom Verducci, A. J. Pierzynski, Eric Karros, Frank Thomas, Dontrelle Willis, Alex Rodriguez, David Ortiz, Nick Swisher, Hunter Pence, Derek Jeter
 NASCAR on Fox  – Clint Bowyer, Larry McReynolds, Michael Waltrip, Todd Bodine, Jamie McMurray, Phil Parsons
 Fox College Football – Joel Klatt, Spencer Tillman, Mark Helfrich, Brock Huard, Brady Quinn, Matt Leinart, Urban Meyer, Petros Papadakis, Reggie Bush, Mike Pereira (rules analyst), Dean Blandino (rules analyst)
 Fox College Hoops – Bill Raftery, Tarik Turner, Jim Jackson, Stephen Bardo, Brian Finneran, Isiah Thomas, Len Elmore, Dino Gaudio, Steve Lavin, Donny Marshall, Nick Bahe, Doug Gottlieb, Sarah Kustok, Dickey Simpkins, Casey Jacobsen, Vin Parise, Stephen Howard, Danny Manning, Jess Settles, LaVall Jordan
 Fox Soccer – Stuart Holden, Tony Meola, Aly Wagner, Cobi Jones, Warren Barton, Mariano Trujillo, Alexi Lalas, Maurice Edu,  Rodney Wallace, Heather O'Reilly, Danielle Slaton, Lori Lindsey, Melissa Ortiz, Leslie Osborne, Landon Donovan, Joe Machnik (rules analyst), Mark Clattenburg (rules analyst)
Fox NHRA – Tony Pedregon
PBA on Fox – Randy Pedersen
USFL – Joel Klatt, Mark Sanchez

Reporters
 NFL on Fox – Erin Andrews, Tom Rinaldi, Kristina Pink, Pam Oliver, Lindsay Czarniak, Shannon Spake, Laura Okmin, Jen Hale, Megan Olivi
 Major League Baseball on Fox – Ken Rosenthal, Jon Morosi, Tom Verducci, Tom Rinaldi
 NASCAR on Fox – Jamie Little, Regan Smith, Jamie Howe, Kate Osborne
 Fox College Football – Jenny Taft, Allison Williams, Bruce Feldman
 Fox College Hoops – Andy Katz
 Fox Soccer – Rodolfo Landeros, Alex Curry
Fox NHRA – Bruno Massel, Jamie Howe, Amanda Busick
PBA on Fox – Kimberly Pressler
USFL – Brock Huard

Studio hosts
 NFL on Fox – Curt Menefee, Charissa Thompson, Chris Myers
 Fox Major League Baseball – Kevin Burkhardt, Chris Myers, Jenny Taft, Noah Eagle
 NASCAR on Fox – Chris Myers, Adam Alexander, Shannon Spake, Kaitlyn Vincie
 Big Noon Kickoff – Rob Stone, Mike Hill, Kevin Burkhardt, Charissa Thompson
 Fox College Hoops – Rob Stone, Kevin Burkhardt, Mike Hill
 Fox Soccer – Rob Stone, Sara Walsh, Jenny Taft, Rodolfo Landeros
 Fox PBC – Chris Myers, Kenny Albert

Former

Play-by-play
 NFL on Fox – Joe Buck, Pat Summerall, Kevin Harlan, Mike Breen, Steve Buckhantz, Eric Clemons, Paul Kennedy, Steve Grad, Tim Ryan, Ray Bentley, Josh Lewin, Scott Graham, Doug Bell, Drew Goodman, Nick Halling, Dan Miller, Ron Pitts, Dave Pasch, Kevin Slaten, Spero Dedes, Matt Vasgersian, Craig Shemon, Carter Blackburn, Brad Sham, Dan McLaughlin, Matt Devlin, Steve Byrnes, Chris Rose, Craig Bolerjack, Tom McCarthy, Mike Goldberg, Matt Smith, Thom Brennaman, Sam Rosen, Dick Stockton, Gus Johnson
 Thursday Night Football – Joe Buck, Kevin Burkhardt, Adam Amin, Joe Davis, Curt Menefee
 NHL on Fox – Mike Emrick, Pat Foley, Kenny Albert, Sam Rosen, Dave Strader, Jiggs McDonald, Dick Stockton
 Fox Major League Baseball – Joe Buck, Chip Caray, Thom Brennaman, Dick Stockton, Aaron Goldsmith
 NASCAR on Fox – Rick Allen, Vince Welch
 Fox College Football – Craig Bolerjack, Brian Custer, Aaron Goldsmith
 Fox College Hoops – Dick Stockton, Thom Brennaman, Brian Custer
 Fox Soccer – Max Bretos, Steve Cangialosi, Ross Dyer, Gus Johnson, Mark Rogondino, Dave Denholm
 Fox XFL – Curt Menefee, Kevin Burkhardt
 Fox USGA – Joe Buck, Justin Kutcher, Shane Bacon

Analysts
 NFL on Fox – Troy Aikman, Cris Collinsworth, John Madden, Bill Maas, Chad Pennington, Brian Billick, Tim Ryan, John Lynch, Donovan McNabb, Charles Davis, Chris Spielman, Tony Gonzalez, Aqib Talib, Sean Payton
 Thursday Night Football – Troy Aikman, Terry Bradshaw, Howie Long, Michael Strahan, Jimmy Johnson, Jay Glazer, Mike Pereira
 NHL on Fox – John Davidson, Joe Micheletti
 Fox Major League Baseball – Bob Brenly, Steve Lyons, Tim McCarver, Gabe Kapler, Pete Rose, Harold Reynolds
 NASCAR On Fox – Andy Petree, Darrell Waltrip, Jeff Hammond, Jeff Gordon
 Fox College Football – Charles Davis, Ryan Nece, Eddie George, Eric Crouch, Darius Walker, Bob Stoops
 Fox Soccer – Brian McBride, Christopher Sullivan, Thomas Hitzlsperger, Jovan Kirovski, Eric Wynalda, Brian Dunseth, Mario Melchiot, Brad Friedel, Grant Wahl
 Fox USGA – Greg Norman, Paul Azinger
 Fox XFL – Joel Klatt, Greg Olsen

Reporters
 NFL on Fox – Ron Pitts, Tony Siragusa
 Thursday Night Football – Erin Andrews, Kristina Pink
 Fox Major League Baseball – Erin Andrews
 NASCAR on Fox – Krista Voda, Dick Berggren, Jeanne Zelasko, Steve Byrnes, Chris Neville, Hermie Sadler, Alan Cavanna, Matt Yocum, Vince Welch
 Fox College Football – Molly McGrath, Shannon Spake
 Fox Soccer – Julie Stewart-Binks
 Fox XFL – Brock Huard, Jenny Taft, Cameron Jordan
 Fox USGA – Chris Myers

Studio hosts
 NFL on Fox – James Brown
 Fox NFL Thursday – Curt Menefee, Michael Strahan
 First Things First – Nick Wright
 NHL on Fox – James Brown, Suzy Kolber
 Fox Major League Baseball – Jeanne Zelasko, Chris Rose, Amber Theoharis
 NASCAR on Fox – Danielle Trotta, John Roberts
 Fox Soccer – Brendan Dunlop, Carlos Machado, Jeremy St. Louis, Kyle Martino, Lara Baldesarra, Lionel Bienvenu, Michelle Lissel, Mitch Peacock, Terri Leigh, Todd Grisham, Julie Stewart-Binks, Ian Joy, Kate Abdo
 Fox Sports Live – Jay Onrait, Dan O'Toole, Charissa Thompson, Don Bell
 Fox UFC – Jay Glazer, Karyn Bryant
 Fox USGA – Lindsay Czarniak
 Rat Race – Chris Myers, Kevin Frazier

Presidents
 David Hill (1993–2000)
 Ed Goren (2000–2010)
 Eric Shanks (2010–present)

Other media
The "Fox Sports" name has been used in other sports media assets. 
 Foxsports.com, a web site operated by Fox Sports Digital Media, provides sports news online. 
 The Fox Sports College Hoops '99 basketball video game is published by their Fox Interactive division. 
 Outside of the U.S, Fox Sports Australia is owned and operated by Foxtel, which is a joint venture between News Corp Australia (owned by the Murdoch family) and Australian telecommunications company Telstra and Fox Sports Japan, which was also joint owned by the Murdoch family and SoftBank Group that operated Fox Sports and Entertainment in Japan and Fox Sports Mexico is owned and operated by Grupo Multimedia Lauman and Fox Sports Argentina is also owned and operated by Mediapro.

See also

Related articles
 NFL on television
 Fox Broadcasting Company
 Fox Sports Radio
 Fox Sports Australia
 Fox Sports International

Main competitors
 CBS Sports
 CBS Sports Network
 ESPN
 ESPN2
 ESPN on ABC
 NBC Sports
 USA
 Peacock
 CNBC
 Warner Bros. Discovery Sports
 AT&T SportsNet

Notes and references

External links
 

 
American companies established in 1994
Mass media companies established in 1994
Sports television in the United States
1994 establishments in California
Companies based in Los Angeles
Cable network groups in the United States